Green Township, Ohio may refer to the following places in the U.S. state of Ohio:

Green Township, Adams County, Ohio
Green Township, Ashland County, Ohio
Green Township, Brown County, Ohio
Green Township, Clark County, Ohio
Green Township, Clinton County, Ohio
Green Township, Fayette County, Ohio
Green Township, Gallia County, Ohio
Green Township, Hamilton County, Ohio
Green Township, Harrison County, Ohio
Green Township, Hocking County, Ohio
Green Township, Mahoning County, Ohio
Green Township, Monroe County, Ohio
Green Township, Ross County, Ohio
Green Township, Scioto County, Ohio
Green Township, Shelby County, Ohio
Green Township, Wayne County, Ohio

See also
Green, Ohio, formerly Green Township, Summit County
Green Camp Township, Marion County, Ohio
Green Creek Township, Sandusky County, Ohio
Greene Township, Trumbull County, Ohio
Greenfield Township, Fairfield County, Ohio
Greenfield Township, Gallia County, Ohio
Greenfield Township, Huron County, Ohio
Greensburg Township, Putnam County, Ohio
Greenville Township, Darke County, Ohio
Greenwich Township, Huron County, Ohio

Ohio township disambiguation pages